Live at Angkor Wat is a semi-acoustic live album by the alternative rock band Placebo, released on 12 December 2011. It was recorded at Angkor Wat in Cambodia on 7 December 2008, at the start of the Battle for the Sun tour. Placebo was the first rock band to play at the temple, which is a UNESCO World Heritage Site. The Angkor Wat concert had previously been released on DVD as part of the Battle for the Sun box set on 8 June 2009 and is currently only available separately in the iTunes Store, where it includes a ten-page PDF digital booklet.

Track list

References

External links
Live at Angkor Wat on Placebo's official website

Live at Angkor Wat on the iTunes Store

2011 live albums
ITunes-exclusive releases
Live albums by British artists
Live alternative rock albums
Placebo (band) albums